Aksnes may refer to:
 Aurora Aksnes, a Norwegian singer
 Kaare Aksnes, a Norwegian astronomer
 2067 Aksnes, a minor planet named for him
 Aksnes, Rogaland, a geographical location on Mainland Karmøy